Shemouniyeh is a Heavy Neolithic archaeological site of the Qaraoun culture in the Palestinian Tubas Governorate in the northeastern West Bank, located five kilometers southwest of Tubas. It is located on a plateau over the north of the Wadi Fa'rah, a little north-west of Deishun. Nearby is the Qaraoun culture occupational site of Wadi Sallah. Large numbers of massive flint tools and debris from this factory site were found and linked to this little known culture that was identified at over 25 sites in Lebanon. Tools found included picks, adzes, borers and flake scrapers.

References

Neolithic settlements
Neolithic
Heavy Neolithic sites
Archaeological sites in the West Bank